Syed Yazid Bin Syed Omar (born 12 August 1978) is a Malaysian unionist with a background in business and finance. He also became an active in sports, and led him into wider into football organisation.

Background

Syed Yazid  was born at the General Hospital, Kuala Lumpur, Malaysia, graduated in International Business Administration which he gained from the University of Northumbria at Newcastle, United Kingdom.

Syed Yazid has been called everything from a recluse to a humble, silent worker. Not much is known about him and his tightly guarded private life because he maintains such a low profile. He is also known to be generous and donates to charities.

Business

Currently, he has business interests in motoring - Proton and Fiat, constructions and industrials sector.

Syed Yazid also holds a position in MISC Swift Integrated Logistics as Director.

Sport (football)

Syed Yazid's participation in the Malaysian football scene is evident with his high-profile positions and involvement in football-related associations. Syed Yazid was the Team Manager of the Kuala Lumpur FA which competed in 2013 Malaysia Youth Cup. He was a player for Kuala Lumpur FA and PDRM FA.

Syed Yazid also has joined KL Malay Mail , MK Land F.C and Selayang Municipal in M - League.

Position Holds :

Amateur Football League, 
Board of Director

Football Association Of Malaysia ,
Executive Committee (2021 - 2025)

Kuala Lumpur City F.C ,
Board Of Director

Kuala Lumpur FA ,
Vice President 1 (2019-2023)

Kuala Lumpur FA ,
Executive Committee (2014-2018)
  
Kuala Lumpur Malays FA, 
Acting President (2014-2016),
Deputy President (2017-2019),
Deputy President (2019-2021)

Team Managed :

- Sukma Games (2018) and (2020)

- Malaysia President's Cup (2018) and (2020)

- Sultan's Gold Cup (2016) and (2018)

- Malaysia Premier League (2015)

- Malaysia Youth Cup (2013) and (2014)

References
http://kualalumpurfa.com/

http://fam.org.my

External links
 http://northumbria.ac.uk/browse/naa/friends/1999/
 http://wilayahkini.blogspot.com/
 http://locengwangsa.blogspot.com/
http://www.thestar.com.my/sport/football/2016/12/02/kl-and-police-are-frontrunners-to-qualify-for-sultans-gold-cup-final/
https://www.pressreader.com/malaysia/new-straits-times/20170223/282333974676241
https://www.pressreader.com/malaysia/the-borneo-post-sabah/20180905/281998968338100
http://www.bernama.com/en/news.php?id=1639256
https://www.wilayahku.com.my/fokus-pelantikan-selewatnya-penghujung-tahun-ini-klfa-mahu-khalid-terajui-persatuan/
https://www.pressreader.com/malaysia/the-star-malaysia/20200522/282089163969405/
https://www.fam.org.my/news/keputusan-pemilihan-jawatankuasa-eksekutif-fam-2021-2025-pada-kongres-ke-57

1978 births
Living people
People from Kuala Lumpur
Malaysian businesspeople
Malaysian trade unionists
Malaysian Muslims
Malaysian people of Malay descent
United Malays National Organisation politicians